Callias was the head of a wealthy Athenian family.

Callias may also refer to:
 Callias (comic poet) (5th century BC), poet of the Old Comedy
 Callias III (4th century BC), Athenian dilettante
 Callias of Chalcis (4th century BC), Greek ruler

Masculine given names